Stephen Uroš is a Serbian royal name, referring to the following members of the Nemanjić dynasty (Serbian Kingdom and Empire):

 King Stefan Uroš I (1243–1276)
 King Stefan Uroš II Milutin (1282–1321)
 King Stefan Uroš III (1321–1331)
 Emperor Stefan Uroš IV Dušan (1331–1355)
 Emperor Stefan Uroš V (1355–1371)
 Stefan Uroš, ruler of Pharsalos (14th century), son of Despot Simeon Uroš

See also
 Uroš, a Serbian given name
 Uroš I (disambiguation)
 Uroš II (disambiguation)
 Uroš Nemanjić (disambiguation)
 Uroš Vukanović (disambiguation)
 Stefan (honorific), an honorific name adopted by the Nemanjić dynasty rulers of Serbia